Nelson William Illingworth (August 1862 – 26 June 1926) was an English sculptor and colourful bohemian.

Illingworth was born in Portsmouth, England, son of Thomas Illingworth, plasterer, and his wife Sarah, née Harvey. He studied at the Lambeth art school and worked as a modeller at the Royal Doulton potteries. He emigrated to Sydney in 1892, and in 1895 his head of an Australian aboriginal was bought for the National Art Gallery in Sydney. Other busts were purchased for the same gallery in 1896 and 1900.

Illingworth did some architectural sculpture for buildings in Sydney, and a large number of portrait busts of notable men of his time such as Australia's first Prime Minister Sir Edmund Barton and 'Father of Federation' Sir Henry Parkes. He also went to New Zealand and modelled some busts of Maori chiefs for the government. While creating sculptures of New Zealand's natives, Illingworth was promoted by the natives of a tribe as a chief of that Maori tribe. At Papawai pa, New Zealand, he erected a monument in 1911, to the memory of Hamuera Tamahau Mahupuku, a distinguished chief of Ngati-Kahungunu.

Illingworth was one of the seven 'heptarchs' of the Dawn and Dusk Club of which Australian writer Henry Lawson and other notable Sydney bohemians were members around 1898. There is speculation that Hannah Thorburn, loved by Lawson, was one of his models and that Lawson met her through him. It was Illingworth who made the death mask of Lawson which is in the Mitchell Library, Sydney (though there is still debate whether the mask was made in the writer's life or death). Illingworth was also something of a composer.

Illingworth was preparing models for the Henry Lawson statue competition when he died suddenly on 26 June 1926 in the Sydney suburb of Harbord. Illingworth left a widow, two sons and two daughters. Illingworth was a well-known and well-liked figure in the art world of Sydney; he is buried in Northern Suburbs (Sydney) cemetery.

References

W. Moore, The Story of Australian Art;
The Sydney Morning Herald and The Daily Telegraph, Sydney, 28 June 1926.

1862 births
1926 deaths
Artists from Portsmouth
English sculptors
English male sculptors
20th-century English sculptors
19th-century English sculptors